Monica Prasad is an American sociologist, and has won several awards for her books on economic and political sociology.

Prasad is Professor of Sociology at Northwestern University and a 2015 Guggenheim fellow. Her research interests are in the areas of economic sociology, political sociology and comparative historical sociology.  her research investigated market-oriented welfare policies in Europe and their economic consequences.

Education 
She studied for her PhD at the University of Chicago.

She was awarded a National Science Foundation Early Career Development Grant, and in 2011 received a Fulbright grant to study at Sciences Po in Paris.

Career 
In 2010, Prasad was a committee member for the Theory Prize, awarded by the Theory Section of the American Sociological Association for outstanding books and papers in the work of theory.

In 2015, she was selected as one of 173 Guggenheim fellows, a John Simon Guggenheim Memorial Foundation-sponsored scholarship.

She is the author of several academic works. In her 2009 book The Politics of Free Markets: The Rise of Neoliberal Economic Policies in Britain, France, Germany, and the United States (University of Chicago Press) she argues that countries' different political climates and policy regimes resulted in divergent types of neoliberalism.

Her 2013 book The Land of Too Much: American Abundance and the Paradox of Poverty (Harvard University Press), examines why the United States has significantly higher levels of poverty and inequality than other rich countries and the impact of government intervention on undermining the welfare state.

Her latest book, Starving the Beast: Ronald Reagan and the Tax Cut Revolution (Russell Sage Foundation Press), was published in 2018.

She is a Senior Fellow at the Niskanen Center.

Awards 
She has twice won the Barrington Moore Book Award from the Comparative and Historical Sociology section of the American Sociological Association, first in 2007 for her book The Politics of Free Markets: The Rise of Neoliberal Economic Policies in Britain, France, Germany, and the United States, and again in 2013 for The Land of Too Much: American Abundance and the Paradox of Poverty, as a co-winner with Michael Mann.

In 2014 she was awarded the American Sociological Association Distinguished Scholarly Book Award for The Land of Too Much: American Abundance and the Paradox of Poverty. This award celebrates the best book published by an ASA member in the preceding two years.

References

External links 

How to Think About Taxing and Spending Like a Swede article in The New York Times (2019)
Land of Plenty (of Government) article in The New York Times (2013)
Is Neoliberalism Over? - an interview with Monica Prasad

Northwestern University faculty
University of Chicago alumni
American women sociologists
Living people
Year of birth missing (living people)
American sociologists
21st-century American women